Sphegina apicalis is a species of hoverfly in the family Syrphidae found in Taiwan.

Description
In male specimens, body length is 5.2 to 5.5 millimeters and wing length is 4.4 to 4.7 millimeters. The face is black and concave with a weakly developed frontal  prominence. The gena is black, mouth edge brown to dark yellow, with large triangular non-pollinose shiny area; occiput black; antenna black with black setae dorsally on scape and pedicel; thorax dark brown to black; scutellum black, shiny, and subtriangular; pro- and mesoleg yellow, tarsomeres 4 and 5 black; metaleg with coxa black, trochanter yellow; femur black and yellow biannulate, incrassate; tibia black and yellow biannulate, without apicoventral dens; tarsus entirely black, basal tarsomere very thick. A very narrow semi-circular area posterior of the lunula is non-pollinose and shiny. The basal flagellomere is squarish, the basal ¼ of the arista short and pilose, about three times as long as the basal flagellomere. The cerci are unmodified and subtriangular; surstyli asymmetrical, the ventral lobe on the right side with subtriangular lobe on posterior margin, on the left side with a long vertical lobe laterally; superior lobe with several sublobes. Female specimens are much the same except for normal sexual dimorphism; body length is 5.0 millimeters and wing length is 3.9 millimeters.

Habitat
S. apicalis is widely distributed in Taiwan at an altitude between 2200 and 2820 meters above sea level. Specimens have been found visiting the flower Astilbe longicarpa (Saxifragaceae) near a small brook within a mainly older Pinus taiwanensis afforestation, and at Xiangyang collected together with S. dentata, S. orientalis, and S. taiwanenis.

Related species
S. apicalis is similar to S. nubicola. They can be differentiated by the very different male genitalia: in S. apicalis the surstyli are angular (curved in S. nubicola), the ventral lobe of the right surstylus has a prominent sublobe at posterior margin (weak sublobe in S. nubicola) and the superior lobes are complicated, with several sublobes (simple in S. nubicola, with only posteroventral claw-like sublobe). The female of S. apicalis differs from that of S. nubicola by the squarish basal flagellomere (oval in S. nubicola) and the squarish, slightly rectangular sterna IV and V (widely to very widely rectangular in S. nubicola).

References

Eristalinae
Insects described in 1930
Diptera of Asia